Zacorisca platyantha is a species of moth of the  family Tortricidae. It is found on the Moluccas, where it has been recorded from Buru.

The wingspan is 27–32 mm. The forewings are blue-blackish, with a large yellowish-white or light yellow trapezoidal patch extending along the dorsum from near the base. The hindwings are purple-blackish.

References

	

Moths described in 1924
Zacorisca